Ciarán Burke (born 1999) is an Irish hurler who plays for Offaly Championship club Ballinamere and at inter-county level with the Offaly senior hurling team. He usually lines out at full-back.

Career

Burke first came to hurling prominence with the combined Ballinamere/Durrow club at juvenile and underage levels, while simultaneously lining out as a schoolboy with Coláiste Choilm in Tullamore. He first appeared on the inter-county scene as a member of the Offaly minor team before later lining out with the under-20 side. Burke made his first appearance with the Offaly senior hurling team during the 2020 National League. He secured his first silverware during the 2021 season, when Offaly claimed the National League Division 2A and Christy Ring Cup titles.

Honours

Offaly
Christy Ring Cup: 2021
National Hurling League Division 2A: 2021

References

External links
 Ciarán Burke appearance record

1999 births
Living people
Ballinamere hurlers
Offaly inter-county hurlers